Trachelipus is a genus of woodlice in the family Trachelipodidae, containing the following species:

Trachelipus aegaeus (Verhoeff, 1907)
Trachelipus aetnensis (Verhoeff, 1908)
Trachelipus anatolicus (Frankenberger, 1950)
Trachelipus andrei (Arcangeli, 1939)
Trachelipus arcuatus (Budde-Lund, 1885)
Trachelipus armenicus Borutzkii, 1976
Trachelipus ater (Budde-Lund, 1896)
Trachelipus azerbaidzhanus Schmalfuss, 1986
Trachelipus bistriatus (Budde-Lund, 1885)
Trachelipus buddelundi (Strouhal, 1937)
Trachelipus camerani (Tua, 1900)
Trachelipus caucasius (Verhoeff, 1918)
Trachelipus cavaticus Schmalfuss, Paragamian & Sfenthourakis, 2004
Trachelipus croaticus Karaman, 1967
Trachelipus difficilis Radu, 1950
Trachelipus dimorphus (Frankenberger, 1941)
Trachelipus emaciatus (Budde-Lund, 1885)
Trachelipus ensiculorum (Verhoeff, 1949)
Trachelipus gagriensis (Verhoeff, 1918)
Trachelipus graecus Strouhal, 1938
Trachelipus kervillei (Arcangeli, 1939)
Trachelipus kosswigi (Verhoeff, 1943)
Trachelipus laoshanensis Biping, Hong & Tian, 1994
Trachelipus lencoranicus Borutzky, 1976
Trachelipus lignaui (Verhoeff, 1918)
Trachelipus longipennis (Budde-Lund, 1885)
Trachelipus lutshniki (Verhoeff, 1933)
Trachelipus marsupiorum (Verhoeff, 1943)
Trachelipus mostarensis (Verhoeff, 1901)
Trachelipus myrmicidarum (Verhoeff, 1936)
Trachelipus nassonovi (Korcagin, 1888)
Trachelipus nodulosus (Koch, 1838)
Trachelipus ottomanicus Vandel, 1980
Trachelipus palustris (Strouhal, 1937)
Trachelipus pedesignatus (Verhoeff, 1949)
Trachelipus pieperi Schmalfuss, 1986
Trachelipus pierantonii (Arcangeli, 1932)
Trachelipus planarius (Budde-Lund, 1885)
Trachelipus porisabditus Verhoeff & Strouhal, 1967
Trachelipus radui Tomescu & Olariu, 2000
Trachelipus rathkii (Brandt, 1833)
Trachelipus ratzeburgii (Brandt, 1833)
Trachelipus razzautii (Arcangeli, 1913)
Trachelipus remyi (Verhoeff, 1933)
Trachelipus rhinoceros (Budde-Lund, 1885)
Trachelipus richardsonae Mulaik, 1960
Trachelipus riparianus (Verhoeff, 1936)
Trachelipus rucneri Karaman, 1967
Trachelipus sarculatus (Budde-Lund, 1896)
Trachelipus sarmaticus Borutzkii, 1976
Trachelipus schwangarti (Verhoeff, 1928)
Trachelipus semiproiectus Gui & Tang, 1996
Trachelipus silsilesii Vandel, 1980
Trachelipus similis Vandel, 1980
Trachelipus simplex Vandel, 1980
Trachelipus spinulatus (Radu, 1959)
Trachelipus spretus (Budde-Lund, 1885)
Trachelipus squamuliger (Verhoeff, 1907)
Trachelipus svenhedini (Verhoeff, 1941)
Trachelipus taborskyi (Frankenberger, 1950)
Trachelipus trachealis (Budde-Lund, 1885)
Trachelipus trilobatus (Stein, 1859)
Trachelipus troglobius Tabacaru & Boghean, 1989
Trachelipus utrishensis Gongalsky, 2017
Trachelipus vespertilio (Budde-Lund, 1896)

References

External links

Trachelipodidae